Pablo Fernández Longoria (born 9 June 1986) is a Spanish football executive. On 26 February 2021, he was named President of Olympique de Marseille, succeeding Jacques-Henri Eyraud.

Early life and career 
Born in Oviedo, Pablo Longoria began at 12 to watch football matches every day as a hobby. A supporter of Sporting Gijón, he enjoys video games such as FIFA 2000 and Football Manager and gained from them a deep knowledge of players and tactical aspects of football. In 2005 he gained work experience with the agent Eugenio Botas who works most notably with the Spanish manager Marcelino García Toral. Marcelino, as manager of Recreativo de Huelva (from 2005 to 2007) then of Racing Santander (from 2007 to 2008), relied on the analysis of the young Longoria while building his team.

Career 
Longoria began his career as a media consultant with Radio Marca after having been spotted by the journalist Axel Torres on the forum Soccerole.com, which he led. At the same time, he began a career as a scout at the English club Newcastle United in November 2007. He didn't stay there very long however, before becoming head scout at Recreativo de Huelva in February 2009. He later revealed that he wished to hire the Portuguese manager André Villas-Boas as head coach at the club. Villas-Boas signed instead with Académica de Coimbra.

In December 2010, he became a scout at Atalanta, then in the Italian Serie B. After 3 years at the club, he joined Sassuolo in July 2013 as head scout, before joining Juventus in August 2015. Notably, he was the origin of the decision to sign the Uruguayan midfielder Rodrigo Bentancur.

Longoria, who can speak 6 languages (Spanish, French, English, Italian, Portuguese and German), became sporting director of Valencia in February 2018. Famous for his work, he has said that he watches seven or eight matches of football most days.

Marseille 
Longoria was named sporting director of Marseille on 26 July 2020, succeeding his compatriot Andoni Zubizarreta. He initially declared his intention to work for the club for five years, with the objective of stabilizing Marseille as one of the 20 best European clubs. Later however he stated that he wanted to stay at Marseille for a long time, making it his “last great adventure”. During his time at the club, he invested in youth, bringing in players such as the Brazilian Luis Henrique, and heightening the clubs scouting reach in Africa. 

On 26 February 2021, he was named president of Marseille with responsibility for the financial and sporting sectors of the club. Longoria is the youngest president of the club since 1909. He brought in Jorge Sampaoli to succeed Nasser Larguet, the interim manager following the departure of André Villas-Boas.

References

1986 births
Living people
Spanish football chairmen and investors
Olympique de Marseille chairmen
Spanish expatriates in France
Juventus F.C. non-playing staff
Atalanta B.C. non-playing staff
Newcastle United F.C. non-playing staff
Olympique de Marseille non-playing staff